Oumar Sidibé (born 25 March 1990) is a Malian professional footballer who plays as an attacking midfielder for the Rwandan club Rayon Sports.

Club career 
Sidibé began his career in Mali with Real Bamako and Stade Malien. He moved to Sudan with Al-Hilal Club in 2013. In 2016, he transferred to the DR Congo with AS Vita Club, and followed that with a stint in Turkey with Hatayspor. On 5 August 2019, he transferred to the Rwandan club Rayon Sports.

International career
Sidibé appeared with the Mali national team in a friendly 3–0 win over Equatorial Guinea on 24 April 2009.

References

External links

NFT Profile

1990 births
Living people
Sportspeople from Bamako
Malian footballers
Mali international footballers
Association football midfielders
Stade Malien players
Al-Hilal Club (Omdurman) players
AS Vita Club players
Malian Première Division players
Sudan Premier League players
Linafoot players
Rwanda National Football League players
Malian expatriate footballers
Malian expatriate sportspeople in Sudan
Malian expatriate sportspeople in the Democratic Republic of the Congo
Malian expatriate sportspeople in Turkey
Malian expatriate sportspeople in Rwanda
Expatriate footballers in Sudan
Expatriate footballers in the Democratic Republic of the Congo
Expatriate footballers in Turkey
Expatriate footballers in Rwanda